Tallula is a genus of pyralid moths in the family Pyralidae. There are about 11 described species in Tallula.

Species
These 11 species belong to the genus Tallula:
 Tallula atramentalis Lederer, 1863 c g
 Tallula atrifascialis Hulst, 1886 c g b
 Tallula baboquivarialis Barnes & Benjamin, 1926 c g b
 Tallula beroella Schaus, 1912 c g b
 Tallula fieldi Barnes & McDunnough, 1911 c g b
 Tallula fovealis Hampson, 1906 c g
 Tallula juanalis Schaus, 1925 c g
 Tallula melazonalis Hampson, 1906 c g
 Tallula rigualis Lederer, 1863 c g
 Tallula tersilla Dyar, 1914 c g
 Tallula watsoni Barnes & McDunnough, 1916 c g b (Watson's tallula moth)
Data sources: i = ITIS, c = Catalogue of Life, g = GBIF, b = Bugguide.net

References

Further reading

External links

 

Epipaschiinae
Pyralidae genera